Sabrina the Teenage Witch is a comic book series.

Sabrina the Teenage Witch may also refer to:

Film
 Sabrina the Teenage Witch (film), a 1996 television film produced for Showtime
 Sabrina Goes to Rome, a 1998 television film produced for ABC
 Sabrina Down Under, a 1999 television film produced for ABC
 Sabrina: Friends Forever, a 2002 animated television film produced by DIC Entertainment

Television
 Sabrina the Teenage Witch (1970 TV series), a 1970–1974 American animated comedy television series that was a spin-off from The Archie Comedy Hour that aired on CBS and in syndication
 Sabrina the Teenage Witch (1996 TV series), a 1996–2003 American fantasy comedy television series that aired on ABC and The WB
 Sabrina: The Animated Series, a 1999 American animated television series that aired on ABC
 Sabrina's Secret Life, a 2003–2004 American animated television series that aired in syndication
 Sabrina: Secrets of a Teenage Witch, an American 2013 animated television series that aired on Hub Network
 Chilling Adventures of Sabrina (TV series), a 2018 American dark fantasy television series that aired on Netflix

Other uses
 Sabrina Spellman, the title character of the comic book series Sabrina the Teenage Witch
 Chilling Adventures of Sabrina, an American comic book series published by Archie Horror, a beginning in 2014

See also
 Teen Witch, a 1989 American teen fantasy comedy film
 "Teen-a Witch", the third episode of the seventh season of the American animated television series Bob's Burgers